Othmane El Goumri (born 28 May 1992) is a Moroccan long-distance runner. He represented his country at two outdoor and one indoor World Championships. In 2016 he was banned from competition for two years due to irregularities in his biological passport. He competed in the men's marathon at the 2020 Summer Olympics.

International competitions

Personal bests
Outdoor
1500 metres – 3:37.79 (Casablanca 2013)
3000 metres – 7:48.95 (Madrid 2013)
5000 metres – 13:13.72 (Rabat 2013)
10,000 metres – 28:16.76 (Rabat 2021)
Marathon - 2:06:18 (Siena 2021)
Indoor
3000 metres – 7:44.73 (Bordeaux 2014)

References

External links
 
 
 
 

1992 births
Living people
Moroccan male long-distance runners
Place of birth missing (living people)
World Athletics Championships athletes for Morocco
Doping cases in athletics
Moroccan sportspeople in doping cases
Mediterranean Games silver medalists for Morocco
Mediterranean Games medalists in athletics
Athletes (track and field) at the 2013 Mediterranean Games
Islamic Solidarity Games competitors for Morocco
Athletes (track and field) at the 2020 Summer Olympics
Olympic athletes of Morocco
20th-century Moroccan people
21st-century Moroccan people